The 2009–10 Lebanese Second Division was the 76th season of the second-highest level of Soccer in Lebanon. This season once again featured 14 Clubs just like the season before.

At the end of the season, both  Homenetmen Beirut and Homenmen Beirut
were relegated to Division 3.

Teams 

This is not the full list.
 Al-Ahli Nabatieh
 Al-Ahli Saida (Newly promoted)
 Al-Bourj FC
 Al-Irshad FC
 Al Islah Burj Shamali (Newly promoted)
 Al Khoyol FC
 Al-Mahabba Tripoli FC
 Al Rayyan Beirut
 Homenmen Beirut
 Homenetmen Beirut
 Racing Jounieh FC
 Salam Zgharta
 Tripoli SC

References

Lebanese Second Division seasons
Leb
2009–10 in Lebanese football